Lorenzo Burghardt is a 1918 German silent film directed by William Wauer and starring Albert Bassermann, Elsa Bassermann and Käthe Haack.

Cast
 Albert Bassermann
 Elsa Bassermann
 Emilie Croll
 Käthe Haack
 Paul Rehkopf

References

Bibliography
 Grange, William. Cultural Chronicle of the Weimar Republic. Scarecrow Press, 2008.

External links

1918 films
Films of the Weimar Republic
German silent feature films
Films directed by William Wauer
UFA GmbH films
1910s German films